is a former Japanese football player.

Playing career
Yamaguchi was born in Machida on August 1, 1973. He joined Verdy Kawasaki from youth team in 1992. However he could not play at all in the match behind Ruy Ramos, Tsuyoshi Kitazawa, Bismarck and so on. In 1995, he moved to Japan Football League club Brummell Sendai and played many matches. In 1996, he moved to newly was promoted to J1 League club, Kyoto Purple Sanga. He played as regular player in 2 seasons and he returned to Verdy in 1998. However he could not play many matches and he moved to Vissel Kobe in July 1999. In 2000, he moved to Gamba Osaka and played many matches. In August 2001, he moved to Vissel again and played until 2003. In 2004, he moved to Japan Football League club Thespa Kusatsu. He played as regular player and the club was promoted to J2 League in 2005. In 2006, he moved to Sagan Tosu and played in 2 seasons. In 2008, he moved to his local club FC Machida Zelvia in Regional Leagues. He retired end of 2008 season.

Club statistics

References

External links

1973 births
Living people
Association football people from Tokyo
Japanese footballers
Japanese expatriate footballers
J1 League players
J2 League players
Japan Football League (1992–1998) players
Japan Football League players
Tokyo Verdy players
Vegalta Sendai players
Kyoto Sanga FC players
Vissel Kobe players
Gamba Osaka players
Thespakusatsu Gunma players
Sagan Tosu players
FC Machida Zelvia players
Association football midfielders